This is a list of massacres that happened in Kosovo throughout modern history.

Ottoman period

Interwar period

World War II

Insurgency in Kosovo

Kosovo War

Aftermath of Kosovo War

See also 
 War crimes in the Kosovo War

References

Sources

External links
 OSCE: Kosovo/Kosova - As Seen, As Told, 1999
 Under Orders: War Crimes in Kosovo (Human Right Watch)
 ICTY: Indictment of Milutinović et al., "Kosovo", September 5 2002
 Report of the UN Secretary-General, January 31, 1999
 Photographic Evidence of Kosovo Genocide and Conflict
 SERBIAN MASSACRES BEFORE NATO AIRSTRIKES
 Kosovo Genocide: Massacres
 The Kosovo Cover-Up
 Kosovo massacre trial
 Judgment in the Vlastimir Djorjevic case, February 23, 2011

Massacres
Kosovo

Massacres